Anil Kumar Yadav may refer to:

 Anil Kumar Yadav (politician, born 1956)
 Anil Kumar Yadav (politician, born 1960)